Chelsea Girls is a 1966 American experimental underground film directed by Andy Warhol and Paul Morrissey. The film was Warhol's first major commercial success after a long line of avant-garde art films (both feature-length and short). It was shot at the Hotel Chelsea and other locations in New York City, and follows the lives of several of the young women living there, and stars many of Warhol's superstars. The film is presented in a split screen, accompanied by alternating soundtracks attached to each scene and an alternation between black-and-white and color photography. The original cut runs at just over three hours long.

The film was the inspiration for star Nico's 1967 debut album, Chelsea Girl, which featured a ballad-like track titled "Chelsea Girls", which was written about the hotel and its inhabitants. The girl in the poster is Clare Shenstone, at the age of 16, an aspiring artist later influenced by Francis Bacon. With its creativity and eroticism, the poster captures the sensual essence of the film, and was designed for its London release by graphic artist Alan Aldridge. Warhol was extremely happy with the design, and commented that he "wished the movie was as good as the poster". The poster was used as the cover art for Felt's 1984 album The Splendour of Fear.

Production
According to scriptwriter Ronald Tavel, Warhol first brought up the idea for the film in the back room of Max's Kansas City, Warhol's favorite nightspot, during the summer of 1966. In Ric Burns' documentary film Andy Warhol, Tavel recollected that Warhol took a napkin and drew a line down the middle and wrote 'B' and 'W' on opposite sides of the line; he then showed it to Tavel, explaining "I want to make a movie that is a long movie, that is all black on one side and all white on the other." Warhol was referring to both the visual concept of the film, as well as the content of the scenes presented.

The film was shot in the summer and early autumn of 1966 in various rooms and locations inside the Hotel Chelsea, though contrary to the film's title, only poet René Ricard actually lived there at the time. Filming also took place at Warhol's studio The Factory. Appearing in the film were many of Warhol's regulars, including Nico, Brigid Berlin, Gerard Malanga, Mary Woronov as Hanoi Hannah, Ingrid Superstar, International Velvet and Eric Emerson. According to Burns' documentary, Warhol and his companions completed an average of one 33-minute segment per week.

Once principal photography wrapped, Warhol and co-director Paul Morrissey selected the 12 most striking vignettes they had filmed and then projected them side by side to create a visual juxtaposition of both contrasting images and divergent content (the so-called "white" or light and innocent aspects of life against the "black" or darker, more disturbing aspects.) As a result, the 6.5 hour running time was essentially cut in half, to 3 hours and 15 minutes. However, part of Warhol's concept for the film was that it would be unlike watching a regular movie because the two projectors could never achieve exact synchronization from viewing to viewing; therefore, despite specific instructions of where individual sequences would be played during the running time, each viewing of the film would, in essence, be an entirely different experience.

Several of the sequences have gone on to attain a cult status, most notably the "Pope" sequence, featuring avant-garde actor and poet Robert Olivo, or Ondine as he called himself, as well as a segment featuring Mary Woronov titled "Hanoi Hannah," one of two portions of the film scripted specifically by Tavel.

Notably missing is a sequence Warhol shot with his most popular superstar Edie Sedgwick which, according to Morrissey, Warhol excised from the final film at the insistence of Sedgwick, who claimed she was under contract to Bob Dylan's manager Albert Grossman at the time the film was made. Sedgwick's footage was used in the Warhol film Afternoon.

Cast
The cast of the film is largely made up of persons playing themselves, and are credited as follows:

 Brigid Berlin as herself (The Duchess)
 Nico as herself
 Ondine as himself (Pope)
 Ingrid Superstar as herself
 Randy Bourscheidt as himself
 Angelina 'Pepper' Davis as herself
 Christian Aaron Boulogne as himself
 Mary Woronov as Hanoi Hannah
 Ed Hood as himself
 Ronna as herself
 International Velvet as herself
 Rona Page as herself
 Rene Ricard as himself
 Dorothy Dean as herself
 Patrick Fleming as himself
 Eric Emerson as himself
 Donald Lyons as himself
 Gerard Malanga as Son
 Marie Menken as Mother
 Arthur Loeb as himself
 Mario Montez as Transvestite

Critical reception
Although the film garnered the most commercial success of Warhol's films, reaction to it was mixed. On Rotten Tomatoes the film has an approval rating of 50%, based on reviews from 10 critics. In the UK, it was refused a theatrical certificate in 1967 by the British Board of Film Classification.

Roger Ebert reviewed the film in June 1967, and had a negative response to it, granting it one star out of four. In his review of the film, he stated, "what we have here is 3½ hours of split-screen improvisation poorly photographed, hardly edited at all, employing perversion and sensation like chili sauce to disguise the aroma of the meal. Warhol has nothing to say and no technique to say it with. He simply wants to make movies, and he does: hours and hours of them." Variety wrote that the film was "a pointless, excruciatingly dull three-and-a-half hours spent in the company of Andy Warhol's friends."

Kenneth Baker of the San Francisco Chronicle reviewed the film in honor of its screening in the San Francisco Bay Area in 2002, and gave the film a positive review, stating "The tyranny of the camera is the oppression The Chelsea Girls records and imposes. No wonder it still seems radical, despite all we have seen onscreen and off since 1966." Jonathan Rosenbaum also gave the film a positive review, stating that "the results are often spellbinding; the juxtaposition of two film images at once gives the spectator an unusual amount of freedom in what to concentrate on and what to make of these variously whacked-out performers." TV Guide reviewed the film in December 2006, granting it four stars, calling it "fascinating, provocative, and hilarious" and "a film whose importance as a 1960s cultural statement outweighs any intrinsic value it may have as a film."

Availability

Home media
Chelsea Girls is largely unavailable for home video format. The film belongs to the Andy Warhol Foundation, and it, along with Warhol's other films (apart from a handful of his Screen Tests, which have since been released on DVD) have never seen home video releases in the United States. In Europe, however, a handful of Warhol's films were released on DVD, including a short-lived DVD print of Chelsea Girls which was available in Italy for some time. This Italian DVD print, which is the film's only official home video release, was released on September 16, 2003.

Museum screenings
While the film is unavailable for personal purchase, it is often screened at art museums, and has been shown at The Museum of Modern Art (which owns a rare print of the film reels) as well as The Andy Warhol Museum in Pittsburgh, Pennsylvania. The film was screened in San Francisco for the first time in nearly 20 years at Castro Theatre in April 2002. Screenings were held in 2010 at the Seattle Art Museum and at the Varsity Theater in Chapel Hill, North Carolina, in 2011 at the High Museum of Art in Atlanta, Georgia, and the 
Block Museum of Art in Evanston, Illinois in 2016. The full 3 1/2 hour version of the film was screened at the Brooklyn Museum in a custom built theatre within their edition of the Andy Warhol: Revelation exhibit from November 19, 2021 to June 19, 2022.

See also
 Andy Warhol filmography
 Hotel Chelsea
 Reality films
 Arthouse cinema
 Eileen Myles

References

External links
 
 
 Andy Warhol's Magic Trick: The Disappearing 16mm Projector , 2014, Chicago Film Society
 Nico Sings Chelsea Girls in the Chelsea Hotel, 1970, YouTube

1966 films
Films directed by Andy Warhol
Films directed by Paul Morrissey
American black-and-white films
Films set in New York City
Multi-screen film
Women in New York City
1960s English-language films
1960s American films